NCI Building Systems, Inc. merged with Ply Gem Parent, LLC in November 2018. In April 2019, the newly-formed company announced that it would officially operate as Cornerstone Building Brands, headquartered in Cary, North Carolina. Cornerstone Building Brands is the largest manufacturer of exterior building products in North America servicing the commercial, residential and repair & remodel markets.

Prior to the merger, NCI Building Systems Inc. was one of the largest manufacturers of metal products for the non-residential construction industry in North America. The company provided a broad range of products for repair, retrofit and new construction activities. It operated within three primary business segments: metal coil coating, metal components and engineered building systems.

History
Formerly headquartered in Houston, Texas, the company was founded as National Components Inc. in 1984 by Johnie Schulte and reincorporated in Delaware in 1991.  In 1994, the company closed an agreement to purchase substantially all the assets and business of Ellis Building Components, Inc. located in Tallapoosa, Ga. In 1998, they completed the acquisition of MetalBuilding Components, Inc. (‘‘MBCI’’)  bringing about doubled revenue base, the acquisition also made it the largest manufacturer of nonresidential metal components in the United States. In 2006, they completed Robertson-Ceco II Corporation (‘‘RCC’’). Robertson-Ceco II Corporation was a leader in the metal buildings industry operating the Ceco Building Systems and Star Building Systemsand Robertson Building Systems divisions. The RCC acquisition helped the company provide greater products, reach more customers and build a more extensive distribution network. In 2012, they acquired Metl-Span LLC, a Texas limited liability company operating five manufacturing facilities in the United States, this acquisition helped the company reduce their cost and energy and enhance the ability to provide comprehensive suite of building products. In November 2018, NCI merged with Ply Gem, Parent LLC to form Cornerstone Building Brands, a leading manufacturer of exterior building products in North America.

References

Prefabricated buildings
Companies based in Texas
Companies listed on the New York Stock Exchange
Manufacturing companies established in 1984
American companies established in 1984